Aana is a village in Lebanon.

Aana or AANA may also refer to:

 Aana Marutha, mythological figure, India
 American Association of Nurse Anesthetists, the professional association
 Arthroscopy Association of North America, an accredited council
 Australian Association of National Advertisers, national body for advertisers

See also 
 A'ana, district, Samoa
 Anah, Iraqi town